The 2020 Belgian Cup Final, named Croky Cup after the sponsor, was the 65th Belgian Cup final. It was originally scheduled to take place on 22 March 2020, but was postponed to 1 August 2020 due to the COVID-19 pandemic in Belgium. The match was played without supporters and saw Club Brugge play Antwerp. Prior to the match, Club Brugge had already won the Belgian Cup 11 times, with their most recent appearance the 2016 Belgian Cup Final loss against Standard Liège. Antwerp featured in the cup final for the fourth time, with their previous final already 26 years ago when the club beat Mechelen on penalty kicks.

Defending champions Mechelen were unable to defend their title as they were found guilty of match-fixing as part of the investigation surrounding the 2017–19 Belgian football fraud scandal and therefore banned from the competition for one season.

Route to the final

Pre-match
Both clubs were only allowed to use players that were part of the squad during the 2019–20 season, meaning that newly signed players during the summer 2020 transfer window were not eligible, while all players who had already left could of course no longer be used either. Antwerp was hampered due to this as no less than nine players had left the club over the summer up to that point, most notably including goalkeeper Sinan Bolat, defenders Dino Arslanagić, Wesley Hoedt and Daniel Opare, midfielders Steven Defour and Kevin Mirallas; and striker Zinho Gano. On the other hand, Club Brugge had seen almost no departures, with Percy Tau most influential.

Match

Details

{| style="width:100%; font-size:90%;"
|style="width:40%; vertical-align:top;"|
Assistant referees:
Florian Lemaire
Vito Di Vincenzo
Fourth official:
Bram Van Driessche

Notes

References

External links
  

Belgian Cup finals
Cup Final
Belgian Cup Final
Belgian Cup Final
Sports competitions in Brussels
Belgian Cup Final
Club Brugge KV matches
Royal Antwerp F.C. matches
Belgian Cup Final